Vesperus fuentei is a species of beetle in the Vesperidae family that is endemic to Spain.

References

Vesperidae
Beetles described in 1905
Endemic fauna of Spain
Beetles of Europe